Villa Paranoia is a 2004 Danish drama film directed by Erik Clausen.

Cast
Erik Clausen - Jørgen
Sonja Richter - Anna
Frits Helmuth - Walentin
Sidse Babett Knudsen - Olga Holmgård

References

External links 

 https://www.rottentomatoes.com/m/villa_paranoia_2004
 https://www.allmovie.com/movie/v312980
 https://www.tcm.com/tcmdb/title/642983/villa-paranoia#overview

2004 drama films
Danish drama films
2000s Danish-language films